Maynaguri Road Railway Station  is one of the railway station that serves the town of Maynaguri in Jalpaiguri district of West Bengal, India, the other being New Maynaguri railway station. Maynaguri Road Railway station lies on New Mal–Changrabandha–New Cooch Behar line of Northeast Frontier Railway Alipurduar railway division.

Trains
Trains like 

 

are available from this station.

References

Railway stations in Jalpaiguri district
Alipurduar railway division